Dallas is an American prime time television soap opera created by David Jacobs. Leonard Katzman was the showrunner, and writer/director, of more episodes than any other person during the series' fourteen-season run (357 episodes). The series was produced by Lorimar.

Directorial staff

Recurring directors
 Leonard Katzman (68 episodes: seasons 2–8, 10–11 and 13–14; also writer and producer/executive producer.)
 Michael Preece (63 episodes: season 4–14)
 Irving J. Moore (52 episodes: seasons 1–5 and 12–14)
 Larry Hagman (32 episodes: seasons 3–14. Also series star (J.R.) and executive producer.)
 Patrick Duffy (29 episodes: seasons 4–8 and 10–14. Also series star (Bobby).)
 Nick Havinga (20 episodes: seasons 6–9 and 14)
 Gunnar Hellström (6 episodes: seasons 2–4 and 6. Also guest star during seasons 12 and 13 (Rolf Brundin).)
 Dwight Adair (5 episodes: seasons 10–11 and 13–14)
 Corey Allen (5 episodes: seasons 2 and 9)
 Gwen Arner (5 episodes: seasons 7–8)
 Cliff Fenneman (5 episodes: seasons 11–13. Also associate producer/co-producer/producer.)
 Linda Gray (5 episodes: seasons 9–12. Also series star (Sue Ellen).)
 Jerry Jameson (5 episodes: seasons 9–11)
 Linda Day (4 episodes: season 9)
 Leslie H. Martinson (4 episodes: seasons 2–3)
 David Paulsen (4 episodes: seasons 6 and 10–11. Also writer and story editor/producer)
 Robert Becker (3 episodes: seasons 8–9)
 Bruce Bilson (3 episodes: season 9)
 Robert Day (3 episodes, season 1)
 Steve Kanaly (3 episodes, seasons 10–12. Also series star (Ray).)
 Russ Mayberry (3 episodes, season 12)
 Alexander Singer (3 episodes, seasons 3 and 8)
 Barry Crane (2 episodes, season 2)
 Lawrence Dobkin (2 episodes, season 2)
 Bill Duke (2 episodes, season 6)
 Harry Harris (2 episodes, seasons 3 and 5)
 Ken Kercheval (2 episodes, seasons 13–14. Also series star (Cliff).)
 Vincent McEveety (2 episodes, season 2)

Single-episode directors
 Roy Campanella, Jr. (Season 9)
 William F. Claxton (Season 7)
 Ray Danton (Season 7)
 Dennis Donnelly (Season 2)
 Larry Elikann (Season 6)
 Victor French (Season 5)
 Michael A. Hoey (Season 9)
 Paul Krasny (Season 7)
 Joseph Manduke (Season 5)
 Alex March (Season 2)
 Don McDougall (Season 2)
 Ernest Pintoff (Season 6)
 Nicolas Sgarro (Season 6)
 Paul Stanley (Season 2)
 Robert C. Thompson (Season 6)

Writing staff

Recurring writers
 Leonard Katzman (72 episodes (including 2 co-written), seasons 2–14. Also director and producer/executive producer.)
 Arthur Bernard Lewis (69 episodes (including 3 co-written), seasons 1–8 and 11–14. Also executive story editor/supervising producer.)
 David Paulsen (45 episodes, seasons 4–8 and 10–11. Also director and story editor/producer.)
 Howard Lakin (24 episodes (including 2 co-written), seasons 4–6 and 12–14. Also supervising producer.)
 Mitchell Wayne Katzman (19 episodes (including 2 co-written), seasons 10–14. Also story editor/co-producer.)
 Leah Markus (14 episodes, seasons 4 and 10–11. Also story consultant.)
 Lisa Seidman (13 episodes, seasons 13–14. Also executive story consultant.)
 Camille Marchetta (12 episodes, seasons 1–3. Also story editor.)
 Peter Dunne (11 episodes (including 6 co-written), seasons 8–9. Also supervising producer.)
 Joel J. Feigenbaum (10 episodes (including 6 co-written), season 9. Also executive story consultant.)
 Will Lorin (9 episodes, seasons 5–6 and 9) 
 Rena Down (8 episodes, seasons 2–4. Also story editor.)
 Linda B. Elstad (7 episodes, seasons 3–6. Also story editor.)
 Louella Lee Caraway (7 episodes, seasons 10–14. Also executive coordinator.)
 Calvin Clements, Jr. (6 episodes, season 10. Also supervision producer.)
 Hollace White & Stephanie Garman (6 episodes, season 9. Also story editors.)
 David Jacobs (5 episodes, seasons 1–3. Also creator and creative consultant.)
 Loraine Despres (3 episodes, seasons 3–4)
 D. C. Fontana & Richard Fontana (3 episodes, seasons 2–3)
 Robert J. Shaw (3 episodes, seasons 4. Also story editor.)
 Ken Horton (2 episodes, seasons 13–14. Also co-executive producer.)
 Susan Howard (2 episodes, seasons 9–10. Also series star (Donna).)
 Bill Taub (2 episodes, seasons 9)
 Worley Thorne (2 episodes, seasons 2–3)

Single-episode writers
 Virginia Aldrige (Season 1)
 Deanne Barkley (Season 9)
 Darlene Craviotto (Season 2)
 Louis Elias (Season 4)
 Frank Furino (Season 6)
 Jonathan Hales (Season 12)
 Jim Inman (Season 2, co-written with Arthur Bernard Lewis)
 Simon Masters (Season 12)
 Bruce Shelly (Season 5)
 Robert Sherman (Season 6)
 Barbara Searles (Season 3)
 Amy Tebo (Season 13)
 Jeff Young (Season 3)
 Jackie Zabel & Bryce Zabel (Season 13)

Production team

Executive producers
 Seasons 1–3: Lee Rich and Philip Capice
 Seasons 4–9: Philip Capice
 Seasons 10–11: Leonard Katzman
 Seasons 12: Leonard Katzman and Larry Hagman
 Seasons 13–14: Leonard Katzman & Larry Hagman, and Ken Horton (co-executive producer)

Producers
 Seasons 1–8: Leonard Katzman
 Season 9: James H. Brown
 Seasons 10–11: David Paulsen
 Season 12: Howard Larkin, and Mitchell Wayne Katzman & Cliff Fenneman (co-producers)
 Seasons 13–14 Cliff Fenneman and Mitchell Wayne Katzman (co-producer)

Associate producers
 Seasons 1–11: Cliff Fenneman
 Seasons 13–14: Frank Katzman and John Rettino

Supervising producers
 Seasons 5–8: Arthur Bernard Lewis
 Season 9: Peter Dunne
 Season 10: Calvin Clements, Jr.
 Seasons 11–12: Arthur Bernard Lewis
 Seasons 13–14: Howard Lakin

Story editors
 Seasons 2–3: Arthur Bernard Lewis (executive story editor) and Camille Marchetta
 Season 4: Arthur Bernard Lewis (executive story editor), and Camille Marchetta, Rena Down & Robert J. Shaw
 Season 5: Linda B. Elstad
 Seasons 6–8: David Paulsen
 Season 9: Hollace White and Stephanie Garman
 Seasons 10–11: Mitchell Wayne Katzman
 Seasons 12–14: Louella Lee Caraway (executive coordinator)

Story consultants
 Seasons 1–2: David Jacobs (executive script consultant/creative consultant)
 Season 9: Joel J. Feigenbaum (executive story consultant), and Leonard Katzman (creative consultant)
 Seasons 10–11: Leah Markus
 Seasons 13–14: Lisa Seidman (executive story consultant)

References

 
 

Lists of directors by television series
Dallas
Dallas (1978 TV series)